New Juaben Municipal District is a former district that was located in Eastern Region, Ghana. Originally created as a municipal district assembly in 1988. However on 1 November 2017 (effective 15 March 2018), it was split out into two new municipal districts: New Juaben South Municipal District (capital: Koforidua) and New Juaben North Municipal District (capital: Effiduase). The municipality was located in the central part of Eastern Region and had Koforidua as its capital town.

Geography 

New Juaben Municipal District fell within Eastern Region of Ghana. New Juaben Municipality covered an estimated area of 110 square kilometers constituting 0.57% of the total land area of Eastern Region.

A predominant natural feature in Koforidua is the 'Obuo Tabri' Mountain, which is considered sacred. Nearby is Akosombo Dam which holds Lake Volta, the world's largest man-made lake. Waterfalls in the area such as Akan Falls and Boti Falls and the Umbrella Rock attract tourists to New Juaben Municipal District and Eastern Region.

Weather
New Juaben Municipal District had an annual rainfall ranging from 50 – 120 inches and 20 – 32 Celsius mean annual temperatures.

Boundaries
New Juaben Municipal District shared boundaries with East Akim Municipality to the northeast, Akuapim North District to the east and south and Suhum Kraboa Coaltar District to the west.

List of settlements

References

External links
 
 Districts: New Juaben Municipal District

Districts of the Eastern Region (Ghana)